Dissent is a philosophy of non-agreement with a prevailing idea or entity

Dissent may also mean:
 Dissent (American magazine), an American political magazine founded in 1954
 Dissent (Australian magazine), an Australian political magazine published from 2000 to 2014
 Dissent (EP), an EP by Misery Index
 Dissent! (network), a G8 protest group
 Dissenting opinion, a judicial opinion which is contrary to a majority decision
 Scientific dissent